Kamran Rasheed Khan (born 1949) is a Pakistani American first-class cricketer as well cricket administrator who played for United States of America national cricket team from 1979 to 1990 as well as played domestic cricket for Lahore cricket team, Pakistan Railways cricket team, Punjab University cricket team from 1964/65 to 1970/71 as a wicket-keeper. He was also the President of United States of America Cricket Association for brief period of time 1999 to 2000. He has coached Haverford College's cricket team since 1974.

References

External links
 
 

1949 births
Living people
American cricketers
Pakistani cricketers
Pakistani cricket administrators
Lahore cricketers
Pakistan Railways cricketers
Punjab University cricketers
American cricket coaches
American cricket administrators
American cricket captains
Pakistani emigrants to the United States
American sportspeople of Pakistani descent
Wicket-keepers